Unión Deportiva Salamanca "B", also known as Club Deportivo Salmantino, was a Spanish football team based in Salamanca, in the autonomous community of Castile and León. Founded on 22 October 1952, it was the reserve team of UD Salamanca, and last played in Tercera División – Group 8, holding home games at Pistas del Helmántico, which seats 5,500 spectators.

History
The club was founded as farm team of UD Salamanca, named Club de Fútbol Salmantino on 30 July 1943. This first club project only lasted four seasons and UD Salamanca had to set it aside for a while in 1947, probably because of economical reasons.

It wasn't until the 1953–54 season that the project was resumed. The club had to be named Club Deportivo Salmantino, and it acted as the reserve team, for players that did not use to play with the main team of UD Salamanca. The colours chosen to play were purple for the T-shirt and white for the pants, even though Salmantino came back to the traditional black and white at the request of some UDS presidents.

In 1997 both entities merged, the team was renamed Unión Deportiva Salamanca B, became the main side's reserve team and started competing in Tercera División. With the dissolution of UD Salamanca on 18 June 2013 due to accumulated debts, Salamanca B also dissolved with the main side, immediately after it was forcibly relegated to the Primera División Regional of Castila & León.

A new club was later formed, taking the name Club de Fútbol Salmantino. It played in Tercera División its two first seasons, inheriting the place of Salamanca B, before being relegated to the last tier as it is considered a completely different club.

Club background
CD Salmantino (1952–97)
UD Salamanca "B" (1997–2013)

Season to season
As farm team

Merger with UD Salamanca

45 seasons in Tercera División

Former players
 Jorge Alonso
 Toti
 Osmar Barba
 Carlos Valverde
 David Montero
 Juanpa
 Víctor Chou
 Gianfranco Di Julio

References

External links
Official website 
Futbolme team profile 

 
1952 establishments in Castile and León
2013 disestablishments in Castile and León
Association football clubs established in 1952
Association football clubs disestablished in 2013
Defunct football clubs in Castile and León
Spanish reserve football teams